Mark Afflick is an Australian former professional rugby league footballer who played in the 1990s. He played for Balmain and Western Suburbs in the NSWRL competition.

Playing career
Afflick made his first grade debut for Balmain in round 14 of the 1990 NSWRL season against South Sydney. Afflick played off the bench in the 44–10 victory at Leichhardt Oval. In 1993, Afflick joined Western Suburbs and played 31 games for the club before being released at the end of the 1996 ARL season.

References

1970 births
Western Suburbs Magpies players
Balmain Tigers players
Australian rugby league players
Rugby league props
Living people